Grupo Antillano was a Cuban artistic group was formed by 16 artists, between 1975 and 1985, in Havana, Cuba.

Members of the group
 Rafael Queneditt Morales (Director). Sculpture and engraving
 Esteban Guillermo Ayala Ferrer (1929–1995). Graphic and environmental design.
 Osvaldo Castilla Romero Sculpture, gold and silver work.
 Manuel Couceiro Prado (1923–1981). Painting.
 Herminio Escalona González. Sculpture.
 Ever Fonseca Cerviño. Painting and engraving.
 Ramón Haiti Eduardo. Painting and sculpture.
 Angel Laborde Wilson. Painting, drawing, ceramics, humor.
 Manuel Mendive Hoyo. Painting, drawing and performance.
 Lionel Morales Pérez. Painting and textile design.
 Claudina Clara Morera Cabrera. Painting.
 Miguel de Jesús Ocejo López. Painting and drawing.
 Marcos Rogelio Rodríguez Cobas. Sculpture, drawing, ceramics and painting.
 Arnaldo Tomás Rodríguez Larrinaga. Painting and drawing.
 Oscar Rodríguez Lasseria. Ceramics, sculpture, drawing.
 Pablo Daniel Toscano Mora (born Caibarién, Las Villas, 18 November 1940; died Havana; 14 August 2003). Painting, drawing, cartoons, graphic design.

Exhibitions
 1968 – AFROCUBA: Works on Paper, 1968–2003
 1978 – Expo-Venta del Grupo Antillano in Centro de Arte Internacional, Havana, Cuba;
 1978 – Headquarters of Conjunto Folclórico Nacional, Havana, Cuba
 1978 – VI Festival Internacional de Ballet, Havana, Cuba
 1978 – Temporada de Danza Nacional de Cuba, Havana
 1979 – Exposición Homenaje a Fernando Ortíz in Biblioteca Nacional José Martí, Havana, Cuba, with guests artists such as Wifredo Lam, René Portocarrero, Manuel Mendive, Anselmo Febles Bermúdez, Roberto Diago, and Armando Posse
 1982 – II Festival de la Cultura de Origen Caribeño, Salón de Exposiciones UNEAC, Biblioteca "Elvira Cape", Santiago de Cuba, Cuba
 1980 – Antilska Skupina/Grupo Antillano in the House of Cuban Culture, Prague, Czech Republic
 1980 – Gallery of the Cultural Committee, Sofia, Bulgaria
 1981 – Carifesta’81 in International Gallery, Community College, Bridgetown, Barbados
 1981 – América negra in Instituto del Tercer Mundo, Mexico City, Mexico
 2013 – Drapetomania: Exposición Homenaje a Grupo Antillano in Galería Arte Universal, Santiago de Cuba, Cuba
 2013 – Drapetomania: Exposición Homenaje a Grupo Antillano in Centro de Desarrollo de las Artes Visuales, Havana, Cuba

Collections
Their works are part of the permanent collections of the Casa del Caribe in Santiago de Cuba.

References

Cuban contemporary artists
Cuban painters
Modern painters
Cuban artist groups and collectives
Afro-Cuban culture